This article is the Electoral history of Sir Wilfrid Laurier, the seventh Prime Minister of Canada.

A Liberal, he was Canada's fourth longest-serving Prime Minister, with the longest consecutive time in office (over fifteen years, from 1896 to 1911). He won four general elections and lost three.  He was succeeded by Sir Robert Borden.  He died in 1919, having been the Leader of the Official Opposition for eight years.

Summary 

Laurier was the fourth-longest serving Prime Minister, serving from 1896 to 1911.  His term in office of 15 years and 86 days (July 11, 1896 to October 6, 1911) remains the longest unbroken term of a Canadian Prime Minister.

He led the Liberals in seven general elections, winning four (1896, 1900, 1904, and 1908) and losing three (1891, 1911, 1917).  He is in a three-way tie with Sir John A. Macdonald and Mackenzie King for the number of general elections he contested as leader of a party.

His streak of four consecutive majority governments (1896, 1900, 1904, and 1908) is tied with Macdonald's identical record as the longest streak of general election victories at the federal level.

Laurier was the second of eight prime ministers from Quebec, the others being Sir John Abbott, Louis St. Laurent, Pierre Trudeau, Brian Mulroney, Jean Chrétien, Paul Martin and Justin Trudeau.  He was also the first of five francophone prime ministers, the others being St. Laurent, Pierre Trudeau, Chrétien, and Justin Trudeau.

Laurier stood for election to the House of Commons of Canada 20 times, in 1874, 1877 (twice), 1878, 1878, 1882, 1887, 1891 (twice), 1896 (three times), 1900, 1904 (twice), 1908 (twice), 1911 (twice), and 1917 (twice), although some of those were multiple elections in the same general election, as was permitted at that time.  He won seventeen of the elections and was defeated three times.

Laurier was elected as a member of the House of Commons for six different constituencies, and at various times sat in the Commons for three different constituencies (Drummond—Arthabaska, Quebec East, Quebec; and Soulanges, Quebec.  He served in the Commons for a total of 44 years, 10 months, 17 days, continuously from the 3rd Parliament, elected in 1874, to his death in 1919.

Laurier served briefly in the Legislative Assembly of Quebec from 1871 to 1874, when he resigned to enter federal politics in the general election of 1874.

Federal General Elections, 1891 to 1917

Laurier led the Liberals in seven general elections, winning four (1896, 1900, 1904, and 1908) and losing three (1891, 1911, 1917).

Federal election, 1891

The 1891 election was Laurier's first election as leader of the Liberals.  His opponent in the 1891 election was Sir John A. Macdonald, in his last election.  Macdonald, aged 76, again led the Conservatives to victory, albeit with a reduced majority.  Laurier remained the Leader of the Official Opposition after the election.

1 Prime Minister when election was called;  Prime Minister after the election.
2 Leader of the Opposition when election was called;  Leader of the Opposition after the election.
3 Acclaimed.
4 Election returns in 1887 did not require candidates to declare party affiliation.  Many candidates did not list a party affiliation.

Federal election, 1896

Laurier won his second general election, defeating the Conservatives led by Prime Minister Charles Tupper. The main issue was the Manitoba Schools Question, which had divided the country on linguistic and religious lines.  Although Tupper and the Conservatives won the popular vote, Laurier and the Liberals won the majority of seats and formed the government, the first time at the federal level that the party with the greatest popular vote support did not form the government.

1 Leader of the Opposition when election was called;  Prime Minister after the election.
2 Prime Minister shortly after election was called;  Leader of the Opposition after the election.
3 Election returns in 1896 did not require candidates to declare party affiliation.  Some candidates did not list a party affiliation.

Federal election, 1900

Laurier again faced Tupper in the general election of 1900.  Laurier and the Liberals increased both their popular vote and seats won.  Tupper retired from public life, the last of the Fathers of Confederation to leave Canadian politics.

1 Prime Minister when election was called;  Prime Minister after the election.
2 Leader of the Opposition when election was called;  Leader of the Opposition after the election.
3 Election returns in 1900 did not require candidates to declare party affiliation.  Some candidates did not list a party affiliation.
4 "Unknown" candidates only received 27 votes nationally.
5 Rounding error.

Federal election, 1904

Laurier again led the Liberals in the 1904 general election.  His opponent this time was Robert Laird Borden, who had replaced Tupper as leader of the Conservatives.  Laurier again won a majority government.

1 Prime Minister when election was called;  Prime Minister after the election.
2 Leader of the Opposition when election was called;  Leader of the Opposition after the election.
3 Independent Liberal candidates received only 309 votes nationally.
4 Election returns in 1904 did not require candidates to declare party affiliation.  Some candidates did not list a party affiliation.
5 Rounding error.

Federal election, 1908

Laurier again led the Liberals in the 1908 general election.  His opponent was again Robert Laird Borden, the leader of the Conservatives.  Laurier again won a majority government, which would be his last of four victories.

1 Prime Minister when election was called;  Prime Minister after the election.
2 Leader of the Opposition when election was called;  Leader of the Opposition after the election.
3 Election returns in 1908 did not require candidates to declare party affiliation.  Some candidates did not list a party affiliation.
4 Rounding error.

Federal election, 1911

Laurier again led the Liberals in the 1911 general election, which was fought on the issue of reciprocity (lowered trade  barriers) with the United States. Naval policy was also an issue.  Laurier lost to Robert Laird Borden, the leader of the Conservatives.  The loss ended Laurier's streak of four electoral victories and fifteen years as Prime Minister.  He became Leader of the Official Opposition.

1 Leader of the Opposition when election was called;  Prime Minister after the election.
2 Prime Minister when election was called;  Leader of the Opposition after the election.
3 Election returns in 1911 did not require candidates to declare party affiliation.  Some candidates did not list a party affiliation.

Federal election, 1917

The 1917 election was Laurier's last election.  The election was fought entirely on the issue of conscription and Canada's role in World War I.  The Liberal Party split between those Liberals who supported the Borden government's policy of conscription, and the Liberals led by Laurier, who opposed it.  The election badly divided the country between English-Canadians, who tended to support conscription, and French-Canadians, who opposed it.  Laurier and the Laurier Liberals lost the election, with Borden winning office as the leader of a Unionist (coalition) government.  Laurier remained as Leader of the Opposition, but died in 1919, ending one of the longest careers in the Parliament of Canada, almost 45 years since he was first elected in 1874.

1 Leader of the Opposition when election was called;  Prime Minister after the election.
2 Prime Minister when election was called;  Leader of the Opposition after the election.
3 Election returns in 1911 did not require candidates to declare party affiliation.  Some candidates did not list a party affiliation.
4 Rounding error.

Federal constituency elections, 1874 to 1917
Laurier stood for election to the House of Commons 20 times, in 1874, 1877 (twice), 1878, 1878, 1882, 1887, 1891 (twice), 1896 (three times), 1900, 1904 (twice), 1908 (twice), 1911 (twice), and 1917 (twice), although some of those were multiple elections in the same general election, as was permitted at that time. He won seventeen elections and was defeated three times.

1874 Federal election:  Drummond—Arthabaska

1877 Federal Ministerial By-Election:  Drummond—Arthabaska
At this time, newly appointed Cabinet ministers had to stand for re-election.

1877 Federal By-Election:  Quebec East

1878 Federal Election:  Quebec East

1882 Federal Election:  Quebec East

1887 Federal Election:  Quebec East

1891 Federal Election:  Quebec East
In the 1891 general election, Laurier stood in two constituencies as was permitted at that time:  Quebec East and Richmond—Wolfe, both in Quebec.  He was acclaimed in Quebec East but was defeated in Richmond–Wolfe.

1891 Federal Election:  Richmond—Wolfe
In the 1891 general election, Laurier stood in two constituencies, as was permitted at that time:  Richmond—Wolfe and Quebec East, both in  Quebec.  He won Quebec East but lost Richmond–Wolfe.

1896 Federal Election:  Quebec East
In the 1896 general election, Laurier stood in two constituencies, as was permitted at that time:  Quebec East and Saskatchewan (Provisional District), North-West Territories.  He won both ridings and chose to represent Quebec East in Parliament.

1896 Federal Election:  Saskatchewan (Provisional District)
In the 1896 general election, Laurier stood in two constituencies, as was permitted at that time:  Saskatchewan (Provisional District), North-West Territories, and Quebec East, Quebec.  He won both ridings and chose to represent Quebec East in Parliament.

1896 Federal Ministerial By-Election:  Quebec East
At this time, newly appointed Cabinet ministers had to stand for re-election.  It was customary for the other party not to field a candidate.

1900 Federal Election:  Quebec East

1904 Federal Election:  Quebec East
In the 1904 general election, Laurier stood in two constituencies, as was permitted at that time:  Quebec East and Wright, both in Quebec. He won both ridings and chose to represent Quebec East in Parliament.

1904 Federal Election:  Wright
In the 1904 general election, Laurier stood in two constituencies, as was permitted at that time:  Wright and Quebec East, both in Quebec.  He won both ridings and chose to represent Quebec East in Parliament.

1908 Federal Election:  Quebec East
In the 1908 general election, Laurier stood in two constituencies, as was permitted at that time:  Quebec East, Quebec, and Ottawa (City), Ontario.  He won both ridings and chose to represent Quebec East in Parliament.

1908 Federal Election:  Ottawa (City)
In the 1908 general election, Laurier stood in two constituencies, as was permitted at that time:  Ottawa (City), Ontario, and Quebec East, Quebec.  He won both ridings and chose to represent Quebec East in Parliament.

1911 Federal Election:  Quebec East
In the 1911 general election, Laurier stood in two constituencies, as was permitted at that time:  Quebec East and Soulanges, both in Quebec.  He won both ridings and represented both seats in the new Parliament.

1911 Federal Election:  Soulanges
In the 1911 general election, Laurier stood in two constituencies, as was permitted at that time:  Soulanges and Quebec East, both in Quebec.  He won both ridings and represented both seats in the new Parliament.

1917 Federal Election:  Quebec East
In the 1917 general election, Laurier stood in two constituencies, as was permitted at that time:  Quebec East, Quebec, and Ottawa (City), Ontario.  He won Quebec East but was defeated in Ottawa (City).

1917 Federal Election:  Ottawa (City)
In the 1917 general election, Laurier stood in two constituencies, as was permitted at that time:  Ottawa (City), Ontario, and Quebec East, Quebec.  He was defeated in Ottawa (City) but elected in Quebec East.

Quebec Constituency Election, 1871:  Drummond-Arthabaska 

Laurier stood for election to the Quebec National Assembly in 1871.  He resigned in 1874 to enter federal politics.

 Elected. 
X Incumbent.

See also 

 Electoral history of Charles Tupper - Laurier's predecessor as Prime Minister.
 Electoral history of Robert Borden - Laurier's successor as Prime Minister.
 Electoral history of William Lyon Mackenzie King - Laurier's successor as leader of the Liberal Party.

References

External links 

 History of Federal Ridings since 1867

Laurier, Wilfrid